The Personnel Secretary popularly called as Secretary (P) is the administrative head of the Department of Personnel and Training (DoPT) under Ministry of Personnel, Public Grievances and Pensions. This post is held by senior IAS officer of the rank of Secretary to Government of India. The current Personnel Secretary is Deepak Khandekar.

As a Secretary to Government of India, the Personnel Secretary ranks 23rd on Indian Order of Precedence.

Powers, responsibilities and postings 
Personnel Secretary is the administrative head of DoPT, and is the principal adviser to the Minister of Personnel, Public Grievances and Pensions on all matters of policy and administration within DoPT. 

The role of Personnel Secretary is as follows:
 To act as the administrative head of DoPT. The responsibility in this regard is complete and undivided.
 To act as the chief adviser to the Minister of Personnel, Public Grievances and Pensions on all aspects of policy and administrative affairs.
 To represent DoPT before the Public Accounts Committee of the Parliament of India.

Emolument, accommodation and perquisites 
The Personnel Secretary is eligible for a Diplomatic passport. 

As the Personnel Secretary is of the rank of Secretary to Government of India, his/her salary is equivalent to Chief Secretaries of State Governments and to Vice Chief of Army Staff/Commanders, in the rank of Lieutenant General and equivalent ranks in Indian Armed Forces.

List of Personnel Secretaries

See also
Cabinet Secretary of India
Home Secretary of India
Foreign Secretary of India
Defence Secretary of India
Finance Secretary of India

References

External links
 DoPT Official website

Government finances in India
Indian government officials
Ministry of Finance (India)